Isaac Jonathan Cruz González (born 23 May 1998) is a Mexican professional boxer. As of November 2021, Cruz is ranked as the world's sixth-best active lightweight by the Transnational Boxing Rankings Board, eighth by BoxRec, and tenth by The Ring magazine.

Professional career 
After amassing a professional record of 19–1–1, Cruz took on former world title contender Diego Magdaleno on the undercard of Gervonta Davis vs. Léo Santa Cruz on 31 October 2020 at the Alamodome in San Antonio, Texas. Cruz took just 53 seconds to stop Magdaleno in the first round of the bout.

In his next fight on 13 March 2021, Cruz took on Jose Matias Romero in a WBA lightweight title eliminator at the Mohegan Sun Arena in Uncasville, Connecticut. In a sloppy affair that saw Cruz docked a point in round six for a low blow, he prevailed by unanimous decision, with scores of 114–113, 115–112 and 118–109 all in his favor.

On 19 June 2021, Cruz took on former WBC super featherweight champion Francisco Vargas on the undercard of Jermall Charlo vs. Juan Macias Montiel. With 47 seconds left in the fight, Cruz landed a left-right combination that sent Vargas to the canvas. Although the latter was able to finish out the fight and hear the final bell, Cruz prevailed as the winner via wide unanimous decision, with scores of 97–92, 99–90 and 100–89 all in his favor.

WBA (Regular) lightweight champion Gervonta Davis had originally been slated to face Rolando Romero on 5 December 2021. However, when Romero was pulled from the bout due to sexual harassment allegations made against him, Cruz was announced as Davis' replacement opponent, marking the first time that Cruz headlined a pay-per-view show. The fight was a tightly contested affair, with the judges' scorecards reading 115–113, 115–113 and 116–112 in Davis' favor, resulting in the second loss of Cruz's professional career.

Cruz rebounded from his loss against Davis on 16 April 2022, when he knocked down former unified featherweight champion Yuriorkis Gamboa multiple times en route to a fifth-round technical knockout victory at the AT&T Stadium in Arlington, Texas on the undercard of Errol Spence Jr. vs. Yordenis Ugás.

Professional boxing record

References

External links
 

1998 births
Living people
Mexican male boxers
Lightweight boxers
Boxers from Mexico City
20th-century Mexican people
21st-century Mexican people